Polybiomyia is a genus of hoverfly.

Systematics
Species include:

 Polybiomyia ablepta   (Riek, 1954)   
 Polybiomyia arietis   (Loew, 1853) 
 Polybiomyia bassleri   (Curran, 1941)  
Polybiomyia bellardii (Shannon, 1925)
 Polybiomyia bequaerti   (Curran, 1938) 
 Polybiomyia bolivari   (Thompson & Wyatt, 2015) 
 Polybiomyia divisa   (Walker, 1857) 
Polybiomyia engelhardti (Shannon, 1925)
Polybiomyia lyncharribalzagai (Shannon, 1927)
Polybiomyia macquarti (Shannon, 1925)
 Polybiomyia nigra   (Bigot, 1884) 
 Polybiomyia odontomera   (Curran, 1941)  
 Polybiomyia pedicellata   (Williston, 1887) 
 Polybiomyia plaumanni   (Curran, 1941)  
 Polybiomyia rufibasis   (Bigot, 1884) 
Polybiomyia sayi  (Shannon, 1925)
 Polybiomyia schnablei   (Williston, 1892) 
Polybiomyia schwarzi  (Shannon, 1925)
 Polybiomyia signifera   (Loew, 1853) 
 Polybiomyia townsendi   (Snow, 1895) 
 Polybiomyia travassosi   (Lane & Carrera, 1943)

References

Hoverfly genera
Eristalinae
Taxa named by Raymond Corbett Shannon